Shuaibu Isa Lau (born 27 November 1960) is a Senator of the Federal Republic of Nigeria from Taraba State. He represents Taraba North in the Nigerian 9th National Assembly. Senator Lau is the Chairman, Senate Committee on Public Procurement.

Lau is a member of the People's Democratic Party (PDP).

Taraba North Senatorial District covers six local government areas: (Jalingo, Yorro, Zing, Lau, Ardo Kola and Karim Lamido).

Childhood and education 
Shuaibu Isa Lau was born in Lau local government area in Taraba State on born 27 November 1960 into the family of Alhaji Isa Ali and Hajji Zainab Isa Ali. He started his educational journey at Local Education Authority Primary School Lau, from 1969 and 1975 and then General Murtala Muhammed College, Yola for his Ordinary Level School Certificate between 1975 and 1980. Thereafter, he proceeded to the School of Basic Studies, Ahmadu Bello University, Zaria in 1980, and later to the faculty of Engineering where he obtained a bachelor's degree in Engineering in 1984.

Political career 
In 2015, Lau joined politics by contesting for the Taraba North senatorial seat under the platform of People's Democratic Party but Abubakar Danladi Sani maneuvered for the seat and was declared winner. He later sought redress in the court and won on 23 June 2017 to become a member of 8th assembly in the Senate until June 2019.

He was re-elected under the same political party, People's Democratic Party on 28 March 2019 where he polled 113, 580 votes to defeat his closest rival, Ahmed Yusuf (Gamaliya) of the All Progressive Congress who scored 111,412 votes to represent Taraba North for another four years. He is the Chairman of Senate Committee on Public Procurement at the 9th National Assembly of the Nigerian Senate.

Family life 
Senator Lau is married to Hajia Fati Ibrahim Hassan Lau and blessed with children.

References 

1960 births
Living people
People from Taraba State
Peoples Democratic Party members of the Senate (Nigeria)
Taraba State Peoples Democratic Party politicians
Ahmadu Bello University alumni